Thiotricha parthenica is a moth of the family Gelechiidae. It was described by Edward Meyrick in 1904. It is found in Australia, where it has been recorded from New South Wales and Tasmania.

The forewings are rather deep ochreous yellow with the costal edge dark fuscous towards the base and with a minute black dot beneath the costa at one-third, and the stigmata minute and black, the plical obliquely before the first discal, but all these apparently sometimes absent. The hindwings are light grey.

The larvae are case bearing. The case is tolerably cylindrical, thick, rather curved and composed of withered fragments of leaf superposed in tiers. They feed on Grevillea punicea, boring holes into the undersurface and discolouring the uppersurface in small blotches.

References

Moths described in 1904
Taxa named by Edward Meyrick
Thiotricha